Carl Chang (born February 13, 1969) is an American entrepreneur, real estate investor, business executive and former tennis coach. He founded the pizza chain Pieology, and is active in real estate investment businesses. He is the older brother and former coach of tennis star Michael Chang.

Early life and education
Chang was born in Hoboken, New Jersey in February 13, 1969..  In 1979, their family moved to La Costa, California, so they could play tennis year round. He graduated from San Dieguito High School in Encinitas, California, in 1987. He attended the University of California, Berkeley and graduated in 1991.

Career

Tennis career
Chang was a talented junior tennis player who was ranked in the top ten at his age group. He beat a number of future professionals, including Pete Sampras, at junior events. Following his graduation, Chang briefly joined the professional tennis tour.  After playing in a few events as a singles player as well as a doubles partner of his younger brother Michael, he decided not to continue and instead became Michael's coach in 1991 – a role he filled until Michael's retirement from the tour in 2003.  Carl Chang was named 'Coach of the Year' by Tennis magazine in 1996.

Real estate
In 2005, Chang and his family started Redwood Real Estate, a joint venture with Seattle-based investment firm Sienna Group. The company had a $500 million fund focusing on distressed housing.

In 2010, Chang founded Kairos Investment Management Co LLC, a private equity firm focused on real estate transactions.  Chang serves as the company's CEO.

Pieology

In 2011, Chang along with partner James Markham, founded Pieology, a fast casual pizza chain restaurant originally based in Fullerton, California. In 2012, Markham left to start his own company, leaving Chang in charge of Pieology.

Other activities
Chang is also the chair of the board of directors of the Los Angeles branch of the Federal Reserve Bank of San Francisco.

References 

1969 births
Living people
Sportspeople from Hoboken, New Jersey
Businesspeople from California
American tennis coaches
American restaurateurs
American sportspeople of Chinese descent
American male tennis players
Tennis people from New Jersey